Karl Alexander (August 23, 1938 – March 30, 2015) was an American fiction writer.

Life
Born and raised in Los Angeles, he was the son and nephew of screenwriters—his father, William Tunberg, wrote the screenplay for Old Yeller, and his uncle, Karl Tunberg, wrote the screenplay for Ben-Hur—and worked on a number of films himself.
Alexander's first novel Time After Time was published by in 1979. It was adapted as a successful 1979 film of the same title, as a musical in 2010, and as a television series to premiere in the fall of 2016.

He became internationally known for his role in the film le Fou 4 in 2004.

Jaclyn the Ripper, Alexander's sequel to Time After Time, was published in 2009.

Alexander died on March 30, 2015, in West Los Angeles.

Published books
Time After Time (1979)
A Private Investigation (1980)
Jaclyn the Ripper (2009) – sequel to Time After Time
Papa and Fidel: A Novel (2010)
Time-Crossed Lovers (2012)

References

External links
 Official website (archived 2015-09-08)
 
 

1938 births
2015 deaths
20th-century American novelists
American science fiction writers
Writers from Los Angeles
21st-century American novelists
21st-century American male writers
20th-century American male writers
American male novelists